Munhwa Broadcasting Corporation (MBC) is one of the leading South Korean television and radio broadcasters. Munhwa is the Sino-Korean word for "culture". Its flagship terrestrial television station MBC TV broadcasts as channel 11.

Established on 2 December 1961, MBC's terrestrial operations has a nationwide network of 17 regional stations. Although it operates on advertising, MBC is a Network Radio Television as its largest shareholder is a public organization, the Foundation of Broadcast Culture. MBC consists of a multimedia group with one terrestrial TV channel, three radio channels, five cable channels, five satellite channels and four DMB channels.

MBC is headquartered in Digital Media City (DMC), Mapo District, Seoul and has the largest broadcast production facilities in Korea including digital production centre Dream Center in Ilsan, indoor and outdoor sets in Yongin Daejanggeum Park.

History

Radio era (1961-1968) 

Launching the first radio broadcast signal (call sign: HLKV, frequency: 900 kHz, output: 10 kW) from Seoul, MBC started as the first non-governmental commercial broadcaster in Korea. On 12 April 1963, it obtained a license from the government for operating regional stations in major cities (Daegu, Gwangju, Daejeon, Jeonju) in Korea, and established a broadcast network which connects six cities including Seoul and Busan.

Black and white TV era (1969-1980) 

MBC launched TV broadcasting on 8 August 1969 (call sign: HLAC-TV, output: 2 kW), and started to broadcast its main news program MBC Newsdesk on 5 October 1970. It reached affiliation deal with 7 commercial stations (in Ulsan, Jinju, Gangnueng, Chuncheon, Mokpo, Jeju, Masan) between 1968 and 1969, and started nationwide TV broadcasting through its 13 affiliated or regional stations. In 1974, FM radio was launched, and MBC took over the Kyunghyang Shinmun (daily newspaper company).

Colour TV era (1980-1990) 

The first colour TV broadcasting was started on 22 December 1980. MBC was separated from the Kyunghyang Shinmun according to the 1981 Basic Press Act. In 1982, it moved into the Yeouido headquarters. That same year, the network founded its baseball team, MBC Cheong-ryong (Blue Dragon), which entered the KBO League as a charter team, in addition to the network being the first home of the league's TV broadcasts. With the live coverage of the 1986 Seoul Asian Games and the 1988 Seoul Olympic Games, MBC made a great advancement in scale and technology.

Ownership of the Blue Dragon was passed to LG Corporation in 1989.

Multimedia era (1991-2000) 

After rapidly growing into a large corporation, covering major international events, MBC established specialized companies for each value chain (MBC Production, MBC Media Tech, MBC Broadcast Culture Center, MBC Arts Company, MBC Arts Center) and spined them off as subsidiaries to become a more efficient corporation amid fiercer competition in the multimedia era. ※ MBC Production and MBC Media Tech were merged into MBC C&I in August, 2011.

Digital era (2001–present) 

As the convergence of broadcasting and communications becomes full-fledged, MBC made its subsidiary iMBC (internet MBC) an independent corporation and pursued various internet-related business. Furthermore, it started cable TV (MBC Plus Media,) satellite TV, new DMB broadcasting and full daytime broadcasting on terrestrial television. In 2007, MBC established digital production centre Ilsan Dream Center, which is equipped with high-tech production facilities. In September 2014, it completed the construction of a new headquarters building and moved from Yeouido to Sangam-dong, opening a new era of Sangam MBC.

In 2001, MBC launched satellite and cable television broadcasting. As part of this expansion it created MBC America, a subsidiary based in Los Angeles, United States, to distribute its programming throughout the Americas. On 1 August 2008, MBC America launched MBC-D, a television network carried on the digital subchannels of KSCI-TV, KTSF-TV, and WMBC-TV. The service was planned to be launched in Atlanta, Chicago, and Washington, D.C. by the end of the year. In northeast metro Atlanta, it aired on WKTB-CD channel 47.3, but as of 2011 is on WSKC-CD channel 22.1.

In March 2013, computer shutdowns hit South Korean television stations, including MBC. The South Korean government asserted a North Korean link in the March cyberattacks, which has been denied by Pyongyang.

International relations 

MBC is an active member of international organizations such as ABU (Asia-Pacific Broadcasting Union), IATAS (International Academy of Television Arts & Science) and INPUT (International Public Television Screening Conference), and is affiliated with 21 broadcasters in 13 countries.

It is engaged in various global business through overseas corporations in Los Angeles and Shanghai, and bureaus in North America, Latin America, Europe and the Middle East as well as Asia, in close cooperation with major global media groups.

MBC is devoted to entering foreign markets and expanding the business area. It maintains a close relationship with foreign buyers by participating in major content markets every year such as MIP-TV, MIPCOM, NATPE, BCWW and ATF. It operates an English website which introduces various MBC content to the overseas buyers and viewers so that they can easily access its content.

MBC drama What on Earth Is Love? is the first Korean Wave drama which sparked the K-drama boom across China, when it was aired on CCTV in 1997. Since then, numerous MBC dramas, entertainment shows, and documentaries have been exported to different countries. The drama Dae Jang Geum was shown in as many as 91 countries around the world. More recently, MBC is widening its content business area by exporting show formats such as I Am a Singer, We Got Married and Dad! Where Are We Going? to other countries.

Channels 
 One terrestrial TV (MBC TV — channel 11)
 Three radio stations:

 Five cable (drama, sports, game-show, variety and documentary)
 Five satellite (drama, sports, game-show, variety and documentary)
 Three terrestrial DMB (TV, radio, data)
 Two satellite DMB (drama, sports)

Logos

Headquarters

See also 
 List of programs broadcast by Munhwa Broadcasting Corporation
 Korean Broadcasting System
 Seoul Broadcasting System
 Educational Broadcasting System
 List of South Korean broadcasting networks
 Contemporary culture of South Korea

References

External links 
 

 
Television networks in South Korea
Korean-language television stations
Mass media companies of South Korea
Mass media companies established in 1961
Television channels and stations established in 1969
South Korean companies established in 1961
Publicly funded broadcasters
Mapo District